Levanon is Hebrew for Lebanon. It is also an Israeli family name. It may refer to the following people:

 Haim Levanon (1899–1986), a mayor of Tel Aviv
 Nehemiah Levanon (1915-2003), leader of Lishkat HaKesher (Nativ)
 Yaacov Levanon (Bilansky) (1895–1965), an Israeli musician and composer

References 

Hebrew-language surnames